Manahan Peak is a prominent peak  east of Giggenbach Ridge in northeastern Ross Island, Antarctica. It was named by the Advisory Committee on Antarctic Names in 2000 after biologist Donal T. Manahan, who worked eight seasons in Antarctica from 1983. Manahan was the United States Antarctic Program principal investigator in a study of the early stages (embryos and larvae) of marine animals, and was chair of the Polar Research Board at the National Academy of Sciences in 2000.

References

Mountains of Ross Island